Manapany (also known as Manapany-les-Bains) is a village on the island of Réunion. Located on the southern coast, between the communes of Petite-Île and Saint-Joseph, it is a quiet holiday spot with a natural swimming pool made from basaltic rock.  

Populated places in Réunion